Sound of Truth: The Independent Collection is a 1997 album by 54-40. It compiles the band's first two independent releases, 1982's Selection (tracks 10-15) and 1984's Set the Fire (tracks 1-9).

Track listing
 "Set the Fire"  – 4:51
 "A Big Idea"  – 3:39
 "What to Do Now"  – 3:10
 "Sound of Truth"  – 4:24
 "Around the Bend"  – 5:35
 "One Place Set"  – 3:27
 "Cha Cha"  – 5:22
 "Lost My Hand"  – 4:28
 "Broken Pieces"  – 6:41
 "Yank"  – 4:54
 "He's Got"  – 3:14
 "Vows, Sobs, Tears & Kisses"  – 3:39
 "Selection"  – 4:17
 "Re-in-living"  – 3:52
 "(Jamming with) Lawrence"  – 5:12

References

1997 compilation albums
54-40 compilation albums